The Whitney - Brunei: The Royal Wedding Celebration was a notable concert performance by American singer Whitney Houston in August of 1996.   
Houston performed a private concert, for the wedding of Princess Rashidah, the eldest daughter of the Sultan of Brunei, Hassanal Bolkiah, at the Jerudong Park Amphitheater on August 24, 1996.

History
The set list was similar to her Bodyguard World Tour in 1993-1994, "Exhale (Shoop Shoop)" was added to the encore. Houston also performed her pop hit song, "Greatest Love of All". The show included five female background dancers, performing with the singer as she sang her uptempo hits. During the introductions of her band members, Houston sang the chorus part of her and Bobby Brown's duet song, "Something in Common". The chorus of the song was re-arranged to "I Wish You Were Here".

She was reportedly paid $7 million to perform for this event. Media stories on the Brunei royal family indicated that Prince Jefri gave Houston a blank check for the event and instructed her to fill it out for what she felt she was worth.

Set list
 "Instrumental"
 "So Emotional
 "Saving All My Love for You"
 "I Wanna Dance with Somebody (Who Loves Me)"
 "How Will I Know"
 Medley: "All at Once" / "Nobody Loves Me Like You Do" / "Didn’t We Almost Have It All" / "Where Do Broken Hearts Go"
 "All the Man That I Need"
 "My Name Is Not Susan"
 "Queen of the Night"
 "I Have Nothing"
 "Something in Common" (Interlude)
 "I Will Always Love You"
 "I'm Every Woman"
 "Greatest Love of All"
 "Exhale (Shoop Shoop)"
 "Exhale (Reprise)"

Personnel
 Musical Director: Rickey Minor
 Bass guitar/Bass synthesizer: Rickey Minor
 Guitars: Paul Jackson, Jr.
 Keyboards: Wayne Linsey, Bette Sussman
 Drums: Michael Baker
 Percussions: Bashiri Johnson
 Saxophones/EWI: Gerald Albright
 Trumpet: Michael "Patches" Stewart, Oscar Brashear
 Background Vocalists: Olivia McClurkin, Pattie Howard, Della Miles
 Little girls dancers: Mercedez Demus, Fajaliah Harper, Vanity Ramdhan, Mistey Ramdhan, Sylvia Enriquez

Security
Alan Jacobs: Director of Security

References

External links
WhitneyHouston.com
Whitney Houston|Facebook
ClassicWhitney.com
Brunei: The Royal Wedding Celebration|Whitney Houston
Brunei: The Royal Celebration

Whitney Houston concerts